Lord Allan may refer to:

Robert Allan, Baron Allan of Kilmahew (1914–1979), British politician
Richard Allan, Baron Allan of Hallam (born 1966), British politician